Samuel Chelanga (born February 23, 1985, in Baringo County, Kenya) is a Kenyan-born American track and field athlete who competed for Liberty University in Lynchburg, Virginia, from 2008 to 2011. He holds the NCAA record for the 10,000 meters run with a time of 27:08.49 set at the Payton Jordan Cardinal Invitational at Palo Alto, California, on May 1, 2010.<ref>USTFCCCA Collegiate Track and Field Records, U.S. Track and Field and Cross Country Coaches Association, (updated May 24, 2018). Retrieved June 17, 2018.</ref> His brother, Joshua Chelanga, is a professional marathon runner.

Early life
Sam Chelanga was born in Kabarsel village, Baringo County, Kenya, and was the 10th of 11 children.

Running career
Collegiate
Originally hailing from Baringo County, Kenya, Chelanga moved to the United States on a sports scholarship. He attended Liberty University, with whom he won the 2009 NCAA Men's Cross Country Championship in Terre Haute, Indiana, and set a course record in 28:41.3. He won a third consecutive title at the Big South Conference cross country championships in October, leading the race by a margin of over half a minute.  In 2010, he defended his title by winning the NCAA cross country championship, becoming only the 11th man in NCAA history to win at least two such titles. He ended his time at Liberty University with fourteen All-American distance honours.

Professional
Chelanga signed a contract with Nike and made his professional race debut at the B.A.A. 10K in Boston in June 2011 under Jerry Schumacher and managed to take fourth place.

In November 2013, he won the 77th Manchester Road Race (4.748 miles), an annual race held on Thanksgiving Day in Manchester, Connecticut, in a time of 21 minutes, 31 seconds. Sam ran a 13:04.35 at Boston University's BU Multi-Team Meet, coming in second. He came in second behind his old college rival Galen Rupp who won in 13:01.26 – a new American indoor 5k record.

From 2013 - January 2015, Sam trained with Dartmouth College alumnus Ben True in Hanover, New Hampshire.

In January 2015, Sam joined coach James Li in Tucson, Arizona.

At the 2016 US Olympic Trials, Chelanga finished the 10,000 meters in sixth place, a minute behind winner Galen Rupp.  But he was the third fastest in the race to hold a sub-28:00.00 qualifying time.

2014 Annual Bests

Seasonal best

2015
Carlsbad 5000 Results:
1. @LawiLalang1 13:32
2. Wilson Too 13:35
3. @Lagat1500 13:40
4. @SamChelanga 13:50

Wharf to Wharf Santa Cruz to Capitola 6 mile results:
1. Sam Chelanga 27:24.48
2. Shadrack Kosgei 27:27
3. John Muritu Watiku 27:28

43rd New Balance Falmouth Road Race
August 16
Sam finished 4th place 32:21 only 4 seconds behind the winner Stephen Sambu.

USA 5 km Championships CVS/pharmacy Downtown 5k Providence, Rhode Island
September 20, 
1. David Torrence      13:56.0
2. Dan Huling          13:59.0
3. Dathan Ritzenhein   14:03.0
4. Sam Chelanga        14:07.0

USA 10 mile championship on October 4
1. Sam Chelanga 46:47
2. Tyler Pennel
3. Dathan Ritzenhein

2016
Sam placed third in 2016 New York Half Marathon in 1:01:43 on 20.03.2016.

Sam placed first in Credit Union Cherry Blossom Ten Mile Run in Washington DC. Sam ran 10 Miles Road in 48:26 on 03.04.2016. The first 🇺🇸a male win at @CUCB since Greg Meyer in 1983!

Sam Chelanga placed fifth in 2016 Payton Jordan Invitational 10,000m in 27:54.57 at Stanford University on 01.05.2016.

Chelanga qualified for the 2016 US Olympic Trials (track and field) at 2016 Hoka One One Mid Distance Classic May 20 hosted by Occidental College by running 5000 metres in 13:27.53.

Chelanga placed sixth in the 10,000 m in 28:56.12 and 22nd in 5000 meters in 13:59.52 at 2016 United States Olympic Trials (track and field).

Chelanga placed second in 59:16 at USATF 20 km Championships at Faxon Law New Haven Road Race.Landry Seeks to Extend USATF Running Circuit Lead at USATF 20 km Championships 9/2/2016 NEW HAVEN, CONNECTICUT USATF. Retrieved by September 5, 2016.

2017
Chelanga took home fourth place in 30:22.2 at 10 km at 2017 USATF cross country championships on February 4, 2017.

Chelanga placed first at NACAC 10 km road race on February 26, 2017.Olympians Top Canadian Contingent At NACAC 10K Road Race Cup February 27, 2017.

Chelange placed first at World best 10 km Road in February in San Juan, Puerto Rico in a time of 28:19.

Chelanga placed third in 15 km Road in March in Jacksonville, Florida, in a time of 43:28.

In May Chelanga served as a pacer for Nike's Breaking2 attempt at achieving a sub-2-hour marathon time.

Chelanga placed ninth in 10,000m at 2017 USA Outdoor Track and Field Championships in June in Sacramento in a time of 29:08.29.

Chelanga placed third in 10 km road in July at Atlanta Journal-Constitution Peachtree Road Race in a time of 28:25 and first at Quad-City Times Bix 7 in a time of 32:53.

Chelanga placed third in September at Faxon Law New Haven Road Race 20 km in a time of 59:16.

Chelanga placed 15th in October at 2017 Chicago Marathon in a time of 2:15:02.

2018
Chelanga placed seventh at 2018 Aramco Half Marathon in 1:00:37. Chelanga ran the sixth fastest American time all-time for the half marathon behind Ryan Hall (59:43 14 Jan 2007 in Houston Texas), Leonard Korir (59:52 19 Nov 2017 in New Delhi India), Dathan Ritzenhein (60:00 1 Oct 2009 in Birmingham England), Abdihakem Abdirahman (60:29 05 Aug 2007 in New York NY), and Galen Rupp (60:29 20 Mar 2011 in New York NY).

 Personal bests Updated May 17, 2014.''

References

External links
Sam Chelanga Track and Field Profile at Liberty Flames

Living people
1985 births
Sportspeople from Nairobi
American male long-distance runners
Liberty University alumni
Liberty Flames and Lady Flames athletes
American male marathon runners
Kenyan male long-distance runners
American people of Kenyan descent
American sportspeople of African descent
Sportspeople of Kenyan descent
American sportsmen